In the Light may also refer to:
"In the Light", a 1975 song by Led Zeppelin
"In the Light", a song originally by Charlie Peacock, covered by DC Talk on their album Jesus Freak
In the Light (Keith Jarrett album), an album of contemporary classical music
In the Light (Max Roach album), an album of jazz music

See also 
 In Light